Psilotreta is a genus of mortarjoint casemakers in the family Odontoceridae. There are more than 30 described species in Psilotreta.

Species
These 39 species belong to the genus Psilotreta:

 Psilotreta abudeb Malicky & Chantaramongkol, 1991
 Psilotreta aello Malicky & Chantaramongkol, 1996
 Psilotreta aidoneus Malicky, 1997
 Psilotreta albogera Mey, 1997
 Psilotreta amera Ross, 1939
 Psilotreta androconiata Mey, 1997
 Psilotreta assamensis Parker & Wiggins, 1987
 Psilotreta baureo Malicky, 1989
 Psilotreta bidens Mey, 1995
 Psilotreta chinensis Banks, 1940
 Psilotreta daidalos Malicky, 2000
 Psilotreta daktylos Malicky, 2000
 Psilotreta daphnis Malicky, 2000
 Psilotreta dardanos Malicky, 2000
 Psilotreta falcula Botosaneanu, 1970
 Psilotreta frigidaria Mey, 1997
 Psilotreta frontalis Banks, 1899
 Psilotreta illuan Malicky, 1989
 Psilotreta indecisa (Walker, 1852)
 Psilotreta japonica (Banks, 1906)
 Psilotreta jaroschi Malicky, 1995
 Psilotreta kisoensis Iwata, 1928
 Psilotreta kwantungensis Ulmer, 1926
 Psilotreta labida Ross, 1944
 Psilotreta lobopennis Hwang, 1957
 Psilotreta locumtenens Botosaneanu, 1970
 Psilotreta ochina Mosely, 1942
 Psilotreta orientalis Hwang, 1957
 Psilotreta papaceki Malicky, 1995
 Psilotreta pyonga Olah, 1985
 Psilotreta quadrata Schmid, 1959
 Psilotreta quin Malicky & Chantaramongkol, 1991
 Psilotreta quinlani Kimmins, 1964
 Psilotreta rossi Wallace, 1970
 Psilotreta rufa (Hagen, 1861)
 Psilotreta schmidi Parker & Wiggins, 1987
 Psilotreta spitzeri Malicky, 1995
 Psilotreta trispinosa Schmid, 1965
 Psilotreta watananikorni Malicky & Chantaramongkol in Malicky, 1995

References

Further reading

 
 
 

Trichoptera genera
Articles created by Qbugbot
Integripalpia